The inferior clunial nerves (also called gluteal branches of posterior femoral cutaneous nerve) are branches of the posterior cutaneous nerve of the thigh. They innervate the skin of the lower part of the buttocks. They pass under the inferior border of the gluteus maximus muscle.

References

External links
 
  - "Superficial Anatomy of the Lower Extremity: Cutaneous Nerves of the Posterior Aspect of the Lower Extremity"

Nerves of the lower limb and lower torso
Buttocks